Leafnode is a store-and-forward NNTP (or Usenet) proxy server designed for small sites with just a few active newsgroups, but very easy to set up and maintain, when compared to INN.  Originally created by Arnt Gulbrandsen  in 1995 while he was working at Trolltech, it is currently maintained by  Matthias Andree and Ralf Wildenhues.

The term leaf node can also be used to describe a node on a binary tree (or any other sort of tree that has nodes) which has no sub-nodes.

References

External links
 Official website
 Leafnode at SourceForge.org
 Installing and Configuring LeafNode

Usenet
Usenet servers